The Funk F-23 was an agricultural aircraft produced in the United States during the 1960s. It was designed by Donald Funk using the fuselage frame of military surplus Fairchild PT-23 trainers as a starting point. The resulting aircraft was a low-wing cantilever monoplane with fixed, tailwheel undercarriage and all-metal construction. The main structural changes were in the wing, which had all-new outer panels. The space occupied by the forward cockpit of the PT-23 was used to accommodate a 200 U.S. gallon (757 litre) hopper for chemicals. Production continued until 1970, when manufacturing rights to the design were purchased by Cosmic Aircraft. The new owner, however, produced no further examples of the type.

Variants
 F-23 - prototype (1 built)
 F-23A - production version with Continental W670-M engine (11 built)
 F-23B - production version with Jacobs R-755 engine (3 built)

Specifications (F-23A)

References

 
 
 

1960s United States agricultural aircraft
Low-wing aircraft
Aircraft first flown in 1962
Single-engined tractor aircraft